Raymund MacMahon was Bishop of Clogher from his appointment on 27 August 1546 until his death in 1566.

See also
Roman Catholic Diocese of Clogher

References

Roman Catholic bishops of Clogher
1566 deaths
16th-century Irish bishops